Harutyun Hovhannisyan (6 November 1981) is an Armenian Greco-Roman wrestler.

Hovhannisyan was a member of the Armenian Greco-Roman wrestling team at the 2013 Wrestling World Cup. The Armenian team came in fourth place. Hovhannisyan personally won a bronze medal.

References

1981 births
Living people
Armenian male sport wrestlers
21st-century Armenian people